Andrei Capitanciuc (born May 28, 1985) is a Moldovan former swimmer, who specialized in breaststroke events. Capitanciuc qualified for the men's 100 m breaststroke at the 2004 Summer Olympics in Athens, by achieving a FINA B-standard of 1:04.98 from the Russian Open Championships in Moscow. He challenged seven other swimmers in heat two, including three-time Olympians Jean Luc Razakarivony of Madagascar and Yevgeny Petrashov of Kyrgyzstan. He shared a second seed with Saudi Arabia's Ahmed Al-Kudmani in a time of 1:05.65. Capitanciuc failed to advance into the semifinals, as he placed forty-seventh overall out of 60 swimmers on the first day of preliminaries.

References

1985 births
Living people
Moldovan male breaststroke swimmers
Olympic swimmers of Moldova
Swimmers at the 2004 Summer Olympics
Sportspeople from Ulaanbaatar
Mongolian emigrants to Moldova
20th-century Moldovan people
21st-century Moldovan people